Long Live the Bride and Groom is a 1970 Spanish drama film directed by Luis García Berlanga. It was entered into the 1970 Cannes Film Festival.

Cast
 José Luis López Vázquez as Leonardo
 Laly Soldevila as Loli
 José María Prada as Pepito
 Manuel Alexandre as Carlos
 Xavier Vivé
 Teresa Gisbert
 Jane Fellner
 Luis Ciges
 Víctor Israel

References

External links
 

1970 films
Spanish drama films
1970s Spanish-language films
1970 drama films
Films directed by Luis García Berlanga
Films with screenplays by Rafael Azcona
1970s Spanish films